Minuscule 938 (in the Gregory-Aland numbering), ε 1451 von Soden), is a 14th-century Greek minuscule manuscript of the New Testament on parchment. The manuscript has survived in complete condition. It contains some liturgical matter.

Description 

The codex contains the text of the four Gospels, on 272 parchment leaves (size ). The text is written in one column per page, 21 lines per page. The leaves are arranged in sedez.

It contains liturgical books with hagiographies: Synaxarion and Menologion.

One leaf catalogued as Minuscule 2161 belonged to the same manuscript as 938.

Text 

The Greek text of the codex is a representative of the Byzantine. Hermann von Soden classified it to the textual family Kr. Kurt Aland placed it in Category V.
According to the Claremont Profile Method it represents textual Family Kr in Luke 1, Luke 10 and Luke 20 as a perfect member.

History 

The manuscript is dated by a colophon to the year 1318. The name of the scribe was Chariton.

The codex 938 was seen by Gregory at the Dionysiou monastery (30), in Mount Athos. 271 folios of the manuscript are housed at the Dionysiou monastery (159 (30)) in Athos. One leaf is housed at the Russian National Library (Gr. 315) in St. Petersburg

The manuscript was added to the list of New Testament manuscripts by C. R. Gregory (938e). It was not on the Scrivener's list, but it was added to this list by Edward Miller in the 4th edition of A Plain Introduction to the Criticism of the New Testament.

The manuscript was examined and described by Kurt Treu.

It is not cited in critical editions of the Greek New Testament (UBS4, NA28).

See also 

 List of New Testament minuscules (1–1000)
 Biblical manuscript
 Textual criticism

References

Further reading

External links 
 

Greek New Testament minuscules
14th-century biblical manuscripts
Athos manuscripts
Dionysiou Monastery